Mobilong may refer to the following places on the west bank of the Murray River in South Australia:
 Hundred of Mobilong, the historic cadastral land unit
 Murray Bridge, South Australia, formerly known as Mobilong
 Mobilong, South Australia, satellite locality of Murray Bridge, South Australia
 Mobilong Swamp, waterbody on west bank of the Murray River within the Mobilong locality.
 District Council of Mobilong, former municipality surrounding the Murray Bridge township
 Mobilong Prison, Murray Bridge
 Port Mobilong, historic river port, Murray Bridge

See also
 Mobilong diamond mine, Cameroon